Leutnant Franz Piechulek was a German World War I flying ace credited with 14 aerial victories.

World War I military service

He was assigned to Kampfeinsitzerstaffel 5 on 27 October 1917. He scored his first aerial victory there, downing a Nieuport on 22 November. He then moved on to Royal Prussian Jagdstaffel 41 on 14 December. On 5 January 1918, he set an enemy observation balloon afire for his second win. Four days later, he moved to Royal Prussian Jagdstaffel 56 to pilot an Albatros D.Va or a Fokker D.VII. He arrived the same day as his new Staffelführer, Franz Schleiff. Between 5 March and 4 October 1918, Piechulek rolled up another dozen triumphs, outlasting both Schlieff and his replacement, Dieter Collin.

Sources of information

References
 Above the Lines: The Aces and Fighter Units of the German Air Service, Naval Air Service and Flanders Marine Corps 1914 - 1918 Norman L. R. Franks, et al. Grub Street, 1993. , .

Year of birth unknown
Year of death unknown
German World War I flying aces
Recipients of the Iron Cross (1914), 1st class